Gaetano I Boncompagni Ludovisi (1706–1777) was the Prince of Piombino, Marquis of Populonia, Prince of Venosa and Count of Conza, Lord di Scarlino, Populonia, Vignale, Abbadia del Fango, Suvereto, Buriano, Cerboli e Palmaiolan, and Lord prince of the Tuscan Archipelago including the islands of Elba, Montecristo, Pianosa, Gorgona, Capraia, and Isola del Giglio, from 1745 until 1777.

References
 Mauro Carrara, Signori e principi di Piombino, Bandecchi & Vivaldi, Pontedera 1996.

Princes of Piombino
1706 births
1777 deaths